John Hele may refer to:
John Hele (died 1661) (1626–1661), English lawyer and politician
John Hele (died 1605), MP for Plympton Erle
John Hele (died 1608), MP for Exeter and Plympton Erle